Coronel Juan Solá is a town and municipality in Salta Province in northwestern Argentina.

References

Populated places in Salta Province